Mount Fray, also known as Catamount because of the Catamount Ski Area located on its north slope, is a prominent peak of the south Taconic Mountains, located in  southwest Massachusetts and adjacent New York. The summit is open and covered in scrub oak; it offers views west over the Hudson River Valley. The sides of the mountain are wooded with northern hardwood tree species. The  South Taconic Trail passes over the summit of Mount Fray.

Details
The south and west sides of the mountain are within Taconic State Park, while the north side is part of the Catamount Ski area. Other parcels are privately owned or are in conservation easement. The summit and northeast side of the mountain are within Egremont, Massachusetts; the southeast side is part of the town of Mount Washington, Massachusetts. The west side falls within Copake, New York.

The east side of Mount Fray drains into Kenner Brook, Hubbard Brook, thence the Housatonic River and Long Island Sound. 
The west side drains into the Roeliff Jansen Kill, thence the Hudson River and Long Island Sound.

References

 Massachusetts Trail Guide (2004). Boston: Appalachian Mountain Club.

External links
 South Taconic Range trail map.
 Taconic State Park New York DEC.
 Catamount Ski Area
 Commonwealth Connections proposal PDF download. Retrieved March 2, 2008.

Mountains of Columbia County, New York
Taconic Mountains
Mountains of Berkshire County, Massachusetts
Mountains of New York (state)